General Boyd may refer to:

Albert Boyd (1906–1976), U.S. Air Force major general
Charles G. Boyd (born 1938), U.S. Air Force four-star general
Elisha Boyd (1769–1841), Virginia Militia general
Gerald Boyd (British Army officer) (1877–1930), British Army major general
John Parker Boyd (1764–1830), U.S. Army brigadier general
Robert Boyd (British Army officer) (c. 1710–1794), British Army lieutenant general

See also
Thomas Boyd-Carpenter (born 1938), British Army lieutenant general